Senator West may refer to:

Members of the United States Senate
Joseph R. West (1822–1898), U.S. Senator from Louisiana
William Stanley West (1849–1914), U.S. Senator from Georgia

United States state senate members
Absolom M. West (1818–1894), Mississippi State Senate
Ben West (1911–1974), Tennessee State Senate
Chris West (politician) (born 1950), Maryland State Senate
E. B. West (died 1854), Wisconsin State Senate
Francis H. West (1825–1896), Wisconsin State Senate
James E. West (politician) (1951–2006), Washington State Senate
John C. West (1922–2004), South Carolina State Senate
Junius Edgar West (1866–1947), Virginia State Senate
Royce West (born 1952), Texas State Senate
Samuel H. West (1872–1938), Ohio State Senate
T. C. West (1868–after 1929), California State Senate
Thomas F. West (1874–1931), Florida State Senate
William H. West (judge) (1824–1911), Ohio State Senate